Kassel Airport (formerly Kassel-Calden Airport, German Flughafen Kassel)  is a minor international airport serving the German city of Kassel in the state of Hesse. There is also a flight school, an ultralight flying school, and a parachuting school based on site.

History

First airfield
Built on farmland,  ASL lying NNE of the Hoher Dörnberg, the airport was opened on 11 July 1970. It has been operated as a public–private partnership since 1991.

New regional airport

A completely new regional airport has been built next to the old airport to accommodate commercial chartered and scheduled carriers as well as the business and general aviation from the old airport. The new airport has officially opened on 4 April 2013 with the arrival of a Germania flight from Frankfurt Airport.

The new airport faced several struggles when opened. The most important customer at first was the travel agency branch of REWE Group, with charter flights to the Mediterranean region. Originally, these were planned to be operated by XL Airways Germany. Following the bankruptcy of that airline, Enter Air was contracted instead, but also pulled out on 20 March 2013. The flights to Tenerife operated by Germania were scheduled to end in October 2013 but already terminated on 22 August 2013 due to low demand. Additionally, the flights to Antalya offered by Tailwind Airlines were reduced in frequency and served less than once a week.

Germania as the airports main user announced that their service to Palma de Mallorca would resume in the 2014 summer season. They also took over the flights to Antalya which had been offered by Tailwind Airlines during the 2013 summer season. While no airline or tour operator offered flights out of Kassel Airport during the 2013/14 winter season, Germania operated two flights per week to Palma de Mallorca and also two flights per week to Antalya in the following 2014 summer season. In the winter season 2014/2015 Germania operated flights to Antalya and Fuerteventura once a week. The airline also announced flights to Palma de Mallorca, Antalya, Heraklion and Hurghada for summer season 2015 and therefore increasing their presence at Kassel Airport.

On 15 March 2014 the airports' chief executive was fired with immediate effect. In January 2015, the airport was renamed Kassel Airport.

In December 2015, Germania announced it would reduce flights to and from Kassel due to low demand, the route to Hurghada ceased entirely by 30 December 2015.

In May 2016, it has been reported that the airport's construction phase is under investigation for violating rules regarding competition and transparency during its procurement. In June 2016, criticism has been made public that there won't be any scheduled flights during the entire winter 2016/2017 schedule. The state government of Hesse will review the airport's financial prospect in 2017 and might vote for the airport to be shut down.

In September 2016, Germania announced that they will not return to the airport for the 2017 summer season leading to the cancellation of all three seasonal services to Antalya, Heraklion and Palma de Mallorca and leaving the airport with barely any scheduled flights. Shortly after, newly founded German leisure charter airline Sundair announced they would base an aircraft at Kassel Airport during the 2017 summer season serving up to 13 weekly flights to destinations around the Mediterranean. The finance minister of Hesse stated that this would be the airport's final chance to establish sustainable operations before being legally downgraded to an airfield due to a lack of consistent commercial services.

In November 2016, the new german airline Sundair announced that they will base an Airbus A319 in summer 2017. They will operate charter-flights for Schauinsland-Reisen, a german tour operator.

In February 2017 Sundair announced, they will base an Airbus A320 instead of an Airbus A319 at Kassel Airport. In May 2017, Amazon.com announced it would end its cargo flights from Kassel to Doncaster Sheffield Airport which led to the reduction of freight operations at the airport by half as Amazon was the largest customer. Amazon maintains a major logistics and delivery facility in nearby Bad Hersfeld. On 1 July 2017 Sundair started their summer schedule flights. Due to the delayed delivery of their ordered Airbus A320 the flights are operated as wet-lease by Cobrex Trans with a Boeing 737 and other Airlines. On 27 September 2017 Sundair started to operate their first Airbus A320 from Kassel Airport, with the first commercial flight to Palma de Mallorca, the day before Sundair received the AOC.

In December 2017, the state government of Hesse announced not to downgrade the airport to an airfield as previously proposed due to an expected positive outlook regarding the negative financial and operational situation.

Facilities

Terminal
Kassel features one single small passenger terminal building with basic facilities such as car rental desks and some shops. As there are no jet bridges, buses and walk-boarding are in use.

Runway
The airport features two aprons, one in front of the passenger terminal for two mid-sized aircraft such as the Airbus A320 family and a separate one for general aviation aircraft.

Airlines and destinations
The following airlines operate regular scheduled and charter flights at Kassel Airport:

The nearest other minor international airport is Paderborn Lippstadt Airport approx.  to the northwest.

Statistics

{| class="wikitable" style="text-align: right; width:200px;" align="center"
|+
|-
! style="width:75px"| !! 
|-
!2013
| 49,557
|-
!2014
|  45,587
|-
!2015
|  64,926
|-
!2016
|  54,822
|-
!2017
|  69,810

|-
!2018
|  131,817

|-
| colspan=5 align="right"| <small>Source: Kassel Airport</small>
|}

Ground transportation
Kassel Airport can be reached via the federal highway B7'' which is itself connected to motorway A7. The express-bus route 100 connects the airport with Kassel city center (journey time approx. 25 minutes) as well as Kassel-Wilhelmshöhe station (40 minutes), which is an important long-distance railway hub.

See also
 Transport in Germany
 List of airports in Germany

References

External links

 Official website
 
 

Kassel
Buildings and structures in Hesse
North Hesse
Defunct motorsport venues in Germany
Sports venues in Hesse